Dyckia trichostachya is a species of flowering plant in the Bromeliaceae family. This species is endemic to Brazil, and native in Goiás state.

References

External links 

trichostachya
Endemic flora of Brazil
Flora of Goiás
Taxa named by John Gilbert Baker